Rapolano Terme is a comune (municipality) in the Province of Siena in the Italian region Tuscany, located about  southeast of Florence and about  east of Siena in the area known as the Crete Senesi.

Until 1949 it was known simply as Rapolano.

The municipality includes several minor towns, among which the village of Serre di Rapolano.

References

External links

 Official website

Cities and towns in Tuscany
Crete Senesi
Spa towns in Italy